Muqsha (Arabic: المقشع، al-Muqsha) is a village in Bahrain and is situated west of the capital Manama. It is also located in Budaiya Highway, where it is located in the northern part of the highway which separates it from the village of Qadam, south of Muqsha. Muqsha also borders the villages of Al-Hilla, Karbabad, Al-Qalaa to the north, Karranah to the west, and Jidhafs to the east.

References

Populated places in the Northern Governorate, Bahrain